Mauricio Gilli Aerodrome is an airport serving Yerba Buena, a western suburb of Tucumán in the Tucumán Province of Argentina. It is commonly known as Aeroclub Tucumán. The main airport of Tucumán is the Teniente General Benjamín Matienzo International Airport,  to the east.

The airport is on the northern side of Yerba Buena, and is used for light aviation, flight training, and radio-controlled aircraft. Rising terrain west of the airport requires approach and departures to be conducted to the east. There are an additional  of grass overrun on the west end of the runway.

See also

Transport in Argentina
List of airports in Argentina
Reserva experimental Horco Molle

References

External links 
OpenStreetMap - Aeroclub Horco Molle
OurAirports - Horco Molle Aeroclub Airport

Airports in Argentina
San Miguel de Tucumán
Buildings and structures in Tucumán Province